

Juneau Icefield Research Camp Facilities 
The Juneau Icefield Research Program (JIRP) and its parent organization, the Foundation for Glacier and Environmental Research (FGER), maintains several research facilities around the expanse of the Juneau Icefield for the purpose of providing educational and expeditionary experience to students with training in Earth sciences, wilderness survival, and mountaineering skills. These camps are private facilities and are operated in accordance with a U.S. Forest Service Special Use Permit, which stipulates that the facilities can be used only for educational and research purposes by the Juneau Icefield Research Program. Thus all non-JIRP related visitation and use of these camps is prohibited.

Notes

USDA/Forest Service(USFS) Remote Campsites 

The United States Forest Service(USFS) maintains several "Camps" around the expanse of the Icefield for recreational purposes. These are modest cabins that recreational hikers can reserve for overnight accommodations.

Notes

See also 
Geospatial Summary of the Juneau Icefield
Geospatial Summary of the High Peaks/Summits of the Juneau Icefield
USGS Historical Topographic Maps for the Juneau Icefield area
Juneau Icefield
List of glaciers and icefields
List of Boundary Peaks of the Alaska–British Columbia/Yukon border

References
US Department of Agriculture/Forest Service(DA)

Organizations/Club Newsletters/Blogs/Reports/etc(NW)

Other

Sources

Mapping Systems 
Caltopo Mapping System(CT)

USGS National Map Viewer System(NM)

Boundary Ranges
Ice fields of Alaska
Ice fields of British Columbia
Tourist attractions in Juneau, Alaska
Tongass National Forest
Bodies of ice of Juneau, Alaska